Three Little Twirps is a 1943 short subject directed by Harry Edwards starring American slapstick comedy team The Three Stooges (Moe Howard, Larry Fine and Curly Howard). It is the 71st entry in the series released by Columbia Pictures starring the comedians, who released 190 shorts for the studio between 1934 and 1959.

Plot
The Stooges are poster hangers who manage to destroy one of the main posters when Moe pushed Curly into the poster just as their boss Herman (Stanley Blystone) comes by to check on them and they just got fired. The boys soon realize that their pay consists of tickets to the circus, but when Curly finds a huge roll of tickets, the trio start scalping them at discount price. After that they pursued by two men who wanted to arrest them for selling tickets for even money which is against the law, Curly destroys the Bearded lady (which she is a Circus freak) and he and Larry disguise themselves as a horse which Curly always loves to impersonate. After being caught by the circus owner (Herman as well) and the local sheriff (Bud Jamison) who was about to take them to prison forever, Herman decides to hire the Stooges as human targets for the spear-throwing "Sultan of Abudaba" (Duke York) but however they managed to escape from the Spear thrower by jumping into a crater Curly created after he fell from the high wire.

Production notes
Three Little Twirps was filmed on August 3–7, 1942. It is the eighth of sixteen Stooge shorts with the word "three" in the title.

Three Little Twirps was the second and last Stooge film directed by Harry Edwards. Plagued with alcoholism, Edwards developed a reputation at Columbia Pictures as the studio's worst director. Having previously directed the laborious 1942 effort Matri-Phony — which took over three weeks to complete (the regular shooting schedule was 3-4 consecutive days) — the Stooges decided they had enough and requested never to work with him again.

External links

Quotes 
 Curly: Here's an impersonation of a wolf. [Whistles] Hiya, babe!
 Moe: I'll take ninety tickets!
 Larry: Beat it, Grandpa! We got no time for kibbitzers!

 Curly: "I haven't been to the circus since I got out of the fourth grade!"
 Moe: "Yeah,that was last year!"

References

1943 films
1943 comedy films
The Three Stooges films
American black-and-white films
Columbia Pictures short films
Films directed by Harry Edwards (director)
American comedy short films
1940s English-language films
1940s American films